Nocardioides dilutus is a bacterium from the genus Nocardioides which has been isolated from a farming field on Bigeum Island, South Korea.

References

Further reading

External links
Type strain of Nocardioides dilutus at BacDive -  the Bacterial Diversity Metadatabase	

dilutus
Bacteria described in 2009